The Reer Diini is a Somali sub-clan. They're a part of Marehan. Reer Diini is one of the largest subclans in marehan. The Reer Diini Clan primarily inhabits Kismayo in the lower Juba region, Northern Bu’ale in the middle Juba region, Abudwak in the Galgudud region, Bardhere and Garbaharey in the Gedo region.

Clan tree 
There is no clear agreement on the clan and sub-clan structures and many lineages are omitted. The following listing of Reer Diini clan tree.

 Ugaas Diini Farah (Reer Diini)

 Ugaas Diini
 Bah Xawaadle
 Reer Ugaas Sharmake
 Reer Siyaad
 Reer Warsame
 Bah Ogaaden
 Reer Dalal
 Reer Xirsi
 Reer Maxmuud Guuled
 Bah Dhulbahante
 Reer Allamagan Diini
 Bah Daraandole
 Reer Kooshin
 Reer Nuur
 Reer Warfaa Diini
 Reer Shirwac Diini
 Reer Maxmuud Diini
 Reer Faarax Diini
 Reer Qaliif Diini ( Qaliif Gawracane )

Notable Figures 

 Fatima Isaak Bihi, The First Somali female Ambassador to Geneva, Director of the African Department of the Ministry of Foreign Affairs.
 Mohamed Aden Sheikh, Premier Somali intellectual, Former head of Somali Technological Development, Medical doctor and Former Ministry of Health, Education and Information, Former Head of the Ideology Bureau SRRC.
 Ahmed Warsame, Former Head of the Somali Military Academy.
 Abdulahi Sheik Ismael Fara-Tag, Member of sen of the upper house in Somalia, Former Vice President Of Jubaland State of Somalia and Former head of the Juba Valley Alliance.
 Mohamed Siad bare, Third president of Somalia
 Abdiwahid Gonjeh, Former Prime Minister of Somalia.
 Abdiweli Sheikh Ahmed, 17th Prime Minister of Somalia, Economist and Politician.
 Mohamed Hashi Abdi, Former Vice President of the Galmudug State.
 Mohamed Abdullahi Farmaajo, 9th President of Somalia, Founder Nabad iyo Nolol party  And Tayo party, Former Prime minister of Somalia.
 Ahmed Abdullahi Gulleid, A columnist, writer and researcher.
 Farah Hussein Sharmarke, a philosopher and poet.
 Mohamud Ali Magan, Former Minister of Planning, Former Consul General to United States Of America and Canada.
 Abdulkadir Sheikh Dini, Former Minister of Defence of Somalia
 Abdi Farah Shirdon, 16th Prime Minister of Somalia.
 Abdirahman Jama Barre, The first Deputy Prime Minister, twice served as the Minister of Foreign Affairs of Somalia, and later as the Minister of Finance. 
 Aden Ibrahim Aw Hirsi, An author and politician – helped with the planning of the Jubaland State and is the current Minister of State for Environment & Climate Change of Somalia.
 Abdullahi Anod, Former Head Commander of the Somali Military Forces.
 Colonel Barre Adan Shire Hiiraale, Former Minister of Defence of Somalia, head of the Jubba Valley Alliance.
 Ahmed 'Idaaja'' Farah Ali, a Somali literary scholar and publisher of written folklore.
 Abdulkadir 'Yamyam'' Hersi Siyad was a Somali poet and playwright.
 Ali Matan Hashi, First Somali pilot and Commander of the Somali Air Force between 1959 to 1978.

See also 
Darood

Marehan

Majeerten

Warsangali

leelkase

Awrtable

Dhulbahnte

Reference 

Somali clans